David Roach (born August 9, 1985) is a former American football safety. He was signed by the New Orleans Saints as an undrafted free agent in 2008 and stayed for six games as a member of their practice squad. Roach spent two seasons with the St. Louis Rams (October 2008 – August 2010) after being released from the New Orleans Saints in October 2008. He played college football at Texas Christian.

Early years
Roach was a First-team All-District 3-5A performer at Abilene High School. He was named to the All-Big Country Super Team after recorded 89 tackles as a senior, broke up four passes, caused one fumble and recovered another.

College career
In 2007 Roach had a career-best 73 tackles, 2 forced fumbles, 5 pass break ups and 1 interception while starting all 12 games after moving from weak safety to free safety mid season. In 2006, as a junior, he started 11 of 13 games and made 33 tackles (26 solo) with four pass break-ups. In 2005, he started the opening two games and played in 11 games and made 41 tackles (25 solo) and 2 interceptions. In 2004, he played in 10 games with 2 starts and recorded 19 tackles, including nine solo stops. In 2003, he had a season-ending knee injury early in fall camp.

Professional career

New Orleans Saints
He was signed by the New Orleans Saints as an undrafted free agent in 2008.

St. Louis Rams
After being released by the Saints he was signed by the St. Louis Rams in 2008. After two seasons with the Rams he was waived on August 17, 2010.

Detroit Lions
On August 19, 2010, he signed with the Detroit Lions and was then waived injured on August 27, 2010.

References

External links
 TCU profile

1985 births
Living people
American football safeties
New Orleans Saints players
St. Louis Rams players
TCU Horned Frogs football players
Sportspeople from Abilene, Texas
Players of American football from Texas